The second season of the Australian drama television series Wonderland, began airing on 15 October 2014 on Network Ten and will conclude on 19 November 2014. The season airs on Wednesdays at 8:30pm.

Production 
On 22 January 2014, it was announced that Network Ten had ordered another 22 episodes of Wonderland to air in 2014 and 2015.

Rick Maier, the head of Drama at Ten stated, "All power to the cast and crew who delivered such a fun show for us last year. We are looking forward to more stories of love, lust and intrigue from the busiest and most romantic block of flats in the country." Filming for the second season began in March 2014.

Of the second season, Jo Porter, the director of Drama at Fremantle Media stated, "We will be building on the strengths of the warmth, romance and humour of our Wonderland residents. In season two viewers will share unexpected twists and turns, fast-paced storylines and dramatic cliff hangers that will test all our characters. We are looking forward to viewers getting to know Australia's favourite flatmates even better as they face love affairs, break-ups and revelations of deep secrets within the Wonderland building. We all can't wait to get started."

Plot 
Set in an apartment building on the doorstep of one of Australia's most beautiful beaches, Wonderland is a warm, light-hearted and engaging relationship drama revolving around four very different couples as they navigate the pitfalls of love, meet the challenges life presents head on, and pursue their dreams.

With an idyllic beachside as the backdrop, the residents of Wonderland show that holding down a dream relationship, an attractive career and maintaining solid friendships is sometimes anything other than plain sailing.

Cast

Main cast 
 Anna Bamford as Miranda Beaumont
 Michael Dorman as Tom Wilcox
 Emma Lung as Collette Riger
 Tracy Mann as Maggie Wilcox
 Glenn McMillan as Carlos Dos Santos
 Ben Mingay as Rob Duffy
 Tim Ross as Steve Beaumont
 Brooke Satchwell as Grace Barnes
 Jessica Tovey as Dani Varvaris

Recurring cast 
 Les Hill as Max Saliba (9 episodes)
 Ewen Leslie as Nick Deakin (8 episodes)
 Martin Sacks as Callan Beaumont (7 episodes)
 Simone Kessell as Sasha Clarke (7 episodes)
 Michael Booth as Harry Hewitt (6 episodes)
 Elise Jansen as Ava McGuire (5 episodes)
 Peter Phelps as Warwick Wilcox (4 episodes)
 Maggie Dence as Ruth MacPherson (2 episodes)
 Roy Billing as Peter Varvaris (2 episodes)
 Joy Smithers as Felicity Philips (2 episodes)

Guest cast 
 Heloisa McMillan as Mama (2 episodes)
 Claire Lovering as Rebecca Morris (2 episode)
 Sandy Winton as Liam (2 episodes)
 Helen Dallimore as Bianca Deakin (1 episode)
 Lydia Sarks as Leigh Burrows (1 episode)
 Renee Lim as Song Luu (1 episode)
 Daniel Krige as Alex (1 episode)
 Mirko Grillini as Trent Morris (1 episode)
 Christie Whelan Browne as Kristen (1 episode)

Casting 
Former Rescue Special Ops actor, Les Hill and former Blue Heelers actor, Martin Sacks both joined the supporting cast as Max Saliba and Cal Beaumont, respectively. Christie Whelan Browne will reprise her character of Kristen in one episode.

Episodes

Ratings 

Figures are OzTAM Data for the 5 City Metro areas.
Overnight – Live broadcast and recordings viewed the same night.
Consolidated – Live broadcast and recordings viewed within the following seven days.

References 

2014 Australian television seasons